Polynesia sunandava is a moth in the family Geometridae. It is found in Sri Lanka and India, as well as on Peninsular Malaysia, Sumbawa, Larat (part of the Tanimbar Islands) and in New Guinea.

Description
Its wingspan is about 26 mm. Forewings with non-truncate apex. Body bright yellow. Head marked with rufous. Shaft of antennae whitish. Tegulae with rufous patches irrorated with silvery scales. Wings with rufous-edged silver spots in very ill-defined series, those below the costa of forewings forming a very ill-defined fascia.

References

External links
Australian moths

Moths described in 1861
Asthenini